Limor Zaltz (born 8 July 1973) is an Israeli former professional tennis player. She played collegiate tennis at the University of Miami in Coral Gables, Florida.

Biography
A winner of two junior grand slam titles, Zaltz was the girls' doubles champion at the 1990 Australian Open and 1991 Wimbledon Championships.

Zaltz, who comes from Haifa, played on the professional tour until 1993, reaching best rankings of 242 in singles and 245 in doubles. All of her 11 Fed Cup matches for Israel were in doubles.

In the early 1990s she played college tennis for the University of Miami. Her younger sister Rinat, an Israel women's national basketball team representative, played basketball for the university.

ITF finals

Singles (2-2)

Doubles (4-6)

See also
List of Israel Fed Cup team representatives

References

External links
 
 
 

1973 births
Living people
Israeli female tennis players
Australian Open (tennis) junior champions
Wimbledon junior champions
Miami Hurricanes women's tennis players
Sportspeople from Haifa
Grand Slam (tennis) champions in girls' doubles
20th-century Israeli women